Microcolona porota is a moth in the family Elachistidae. It is found in India (Assam).

The wingspan is 10–12 mm. The forewings are brown with a tuft of scales mixed with dark fuscous and blackish towards the dorsum at two-fifths and another in the disc at three-fourths. There is an indistinct spot of dark fuscous irroration towards the costa at two-thirds. There is an elongate mark of dark fuscous irroration on the costa at two-thirds. There are a few scattered blackish scales in the disc and towards the apex. The hindwings are grey.

References

Moths described in 1917
Microcolona
Moths of Asia